Mill Neck is a village in the Town of Oyster Bay in Nassau County, on the North Shore of Long Island, in New York, United States. The population was 997 at the 2010 census.

History 
Mill Neck incorporated as a village in 1925. Many Gold Coast-era estates were constructed in Mill Neck during the Gold Coast era.

Mill Neck Village Hall, which also houses the village's branch of the United States Post Office, is located in the former station house of the Mill Neck Long Island Rail Road station. This station, which was located on the Oyster Bay Branch, closed in 1998 due to low ridership. The Old Brookville Police Department also has a substation within the building.

Geography

According to the United States Environmental Protection Agency and the United States Geological Survey, the highest point in Mill Neck is Mill Hill.

Demographics

As of the census of 2000, there were 825 people, 295 households, and 241 families residing in the village. The population density was 319.8 people per square mile (123.5/km2). There were 326 housing units at an average density of 126.4 per square mile (48.8/km2). The racial makeup of the village was 92.00% White, 0.24% African American, 4.73% Asian, 2.42% from other races, and 0.61% from two or more races. Hispanic or Latino of any race were 5.58% of the population.

There were 295 households, out of which 34.6% had children under the age of 18 living with them, 74.9% were married couples living together, 5.8% had a female householder with no husband present, and 18.0% were non-families. 13.6% of all households were made up of individuals, and 6.4% had someone living alone who was 65 years of age or older. The average household size was 2.80 and the average family size was 3.07.

In the village, the population was spread out, with 23.3% under the age of 18, 4.4% from 18 to 24, 24.7% from 25 to 44, 31.0% from 45 to 64, and 16.6% who were 65 years of age or older. The median age was 44 years. For every 100 females, there were 97.4 males. For every 100 females age 18 and over, there were 97.2 males.

The median income for a household in the village was $125,477, and the median income for a family was $145,643. Males had a median income of $95,429 versus $51,528 for females. The per capita income for the village was $77,899. About 2.3% of families and 2.9% of the population were below the poverty line, including none of those under age 18 and 3.6% of those age 65 or over.

Government 
As of August 2021, the Mayor of Mill Neck is Peter Quick, the Deputy Mayor is John K. Colgate, Jr., and the Village Trustees are John K. Colgate, Jr., Randolph Harrison, Joshua Kugler, Alice G. Smith and Peter Quick.

Education

School district 
The Village of Mill Neck is  split between the Locust Valley Central School District and the Oyster Bay–East Norwich Central School District. As such, children who reside within Mill Neck and attend public schools go to school in one of these two districts depending on where in Mill Neck they live.

Library district 
Mill Neck is split between the Locust Valley Library District and the Oyster Bay–East Norwich Library District.

References

External links 

 Official website

Oyster Bay (town), New York
Villages in New York (state)
Villages in Nassau County, New York
Populated coastal places in New York (state)